Lukarta of Bogen (born 1075) was a Duchess consort of Bohemia, married to Bretislaus II, Duke of Bohemia. 

 In the month of September of the same year, Prince Bohemia took a lady as his wife from Bavaria named Lukarda, the sister of Count Albrecht...
 — Cosmas of Prague 

The marriage took place in 1094 and had political significance. Břetislav and Lukarta had a son Břetislav, born on June 30, probably in 1095.

References 

J. Čechura, J. Mikulec, F. Stellner. Lexikon českých panovnických dynasties . Prague, 1996, p. 31.

Duchesses of Bohemia
1075 births
Year of death unknown